The Edwin Irby Hatch Nuclear Power Plant is near Baxley, Georgia, in the southeastern United States, on a 2,244-acre (9 km²) site. It has two General Electric boiling water reactors with a total capacity of 1,848 megawatts. Previously, the reactors had a combined capacity listing of 1,759 MW. Unit 1 went online in 1974 and was followed by Unit 2 in 1978.
The plant was named for Edwin I. Hatch, president of Georgia Power from 1963 to 1975, and chairman from 1975 to 1978.

In 2002, the Nuclear Regulatory Commission (NRC) extended the operating licenses for both reactors for an additional twenty years.

Ownership 

The Hatch plant is operated by Southern Nuclear Operating Company, a subsidiary of Southern Company. Hatch's owners are:

 Georgia Power (50.1%) (also a Southern Company subsidiary)
 Oglethorpe Power Corporation (30%)
 Municipal Electric Authority of Georgia  (17.7%)
 Dalton Water & Light Sinking Fund Commission (2.2%)

Electricity Production

Surrounding population

The 2010 U.S. population within  of Hatch was 11,061, an increase of 6.7 percent in a decade, according to an analysis of U.S. Census data for msnbc.com. The 2010 U.S. population within  was 424,741, an increase of 12.0 percent since 2000. Cities within 50 miles include Vidalia (19 miles to city center).

Onsite storage of spent nuclear fuel
Spent nuclear fuel is stored on-site in concrete casks.  The Hatch Plant, a BWR, near Baxley GA is estimated by DOE, as of this year, to have generated 1,446 metric tons of spent fuel.

Seismic risk
The Nuclear Regulatory Commission's estimate of the risk each year of an earthquake intense enough to cause core damage to the reactor at Hatch was 1 in 454,545, according to an NRC study published in August 2010.

References

Energy infrastructure completed in 1974
Energy infrastructure completed in 1978
Buildings and structures in Appling County, Georgia
Southern Company
Georgia Power
Nuclear power plants in Georgia (U.S. state)
1974 establishments in Georgia (U.S. state)
Oglethorpe Power